Dobri Do is a Serbo-Croatian place name, meaning "good dale". It may refer to:

Serbia
Dobri Do, Ivanjica
Dobri Do, Kuršumlija
Dobri Do, Pirot
Dobri Do, Smederevo

Bosnia and Herzegovina
Dobri Do, Neum, in Neum

See also
Dobri dol (disambiguation)
Dobrodol (disambiguation)
Dobrodo

Serbo-Croatian place names